Croatian–Dutch are foreign relations between Croatia and Netherlands. Both countries established diplomatic relations on April 23, 1992. Croatia has an embassy in The Hague. The Netherlands have an embassy in Zagreb and 3 honorary consulates (in Dubrovnik, Opatija and Split).
Both countries are full members of the European Union and NATO.
Netherlands joined the EU as a founding member state, and Croatia joined the EU in 2013. 
the Netherlands has given full support to Croatia's membership in the European Union and NATO.

Resident diplomatic missions
 Croatia has an embassy in The Hague.
 Netherlands has an embassy in Zagreb.

See also 
 Foreign relations of Croatia
 Foreign relations of the Netherlands
 Croatia in the European Union

References

External links 
Croatian Ministry of Foreign Affairs and European Integration: list of bilateral treaties with the Netherlands
Croatian embassy in The Hague 
Dutch Ministry of Foreign Affairs about the relation with Croatia (in Dutch only) 
Dutch embassy in Zagreb

 
 

 
 
Netherlands
Croatia